Rwanyanya was a Prince and fifth child of Mwami Yuhi IV Gahindiro of Kingdom of Rwanda who lived in 19th century. His son was Kannanga, father of notable chiefs Tutuba and Kanyemera.

References

Year of birth missing
Year of death missing
Rwandan monarchy